NGC 5792 is a barred spiral galaxy about 70 million light-years away in the constellation Libra. There is a magnitude 9.6 star on the northwestern edge of the galaxy. It was discovered on April 11, 1787 by the astronomer William Herschel. It is a member of the Virgo III Groups, a series of galaxies and galaxy clusters strung out to the east of the Virgo Supercluster of galaxies.

References

External links

 

Barred spiral galaxies
5792
Libra (constellation)